Ang Pamana: The Inheritance is a 2006 Filipino supernatural thriller film.

Romeo Candido directed and wrote the script for the film while his wife Caroline Mangosing produced it. Carmen De Jesus and Ria Limjap were credited as screenwriters.

The movie was filmed in Canada and the Philippines, premiered at the Louis Vuitton Hawaii International Film Festival and released theatrically in the Philippines in November 2006.

The film is based on traditional Filipino folklore, and mentions creatures such as duwende, manananggal and kapre.

Plot
Canada-based Filipino siblings Anna and Johnny are asked by their dad to attend the wake of their grandmother (lola) and to represent their family in the reading of her will in Manila.

Together with their cousin, Vanessa, they inherit their lola's 19-hectare property/farm in rural Bulacan. The three of them get along, especially Johnny and Vanessa due to their shared vice. Johnny also gets along with his lola's adoptive autistic grandson, Tommy, who's also inherited part of the same property.

Mang Dante and Celia act as caretakers of the property and live with the inheritors.

Vanessa takes the siblings to the local marketplace - where a mysterious old woman (implied to be the human form of a manananggal, meaning "the one who removes" - a type of aswang that preys on pregnant women or sick people) briefly touches Anna's belly (an act which "marks" an intended victim) - and later the whole property together with Tommy. She also shows them her very own marijuana plantation there, which she believes will make them a fortune albeit illegally. Anna and Johnny are hesitant, but Vanessa says no one dares to go to their land as locals believe there are supernatural entities inhabiting it. Vanessa herself doesn't believe the tales, but it helped keep the stash a secret.

While checking out a particular mango tree nearby, Tommy appears to be talking to someone up there. Johnny, who was then recording their travel, catches something peculiar on tape.

Through either his dreams or drug-induced stupor, Johnny recalls some details of his time with his lola as a kid. She mainly shares with him the tale of the manananggal. It is revealed that he and his lola saw it in the said property at least once, and that she warned him never to enter the wooded area there. She also says that one day, he'll set things right.

Throughout their stay, the house is slowly revealed to be haunted by their lola's spirit. The spirit makes its presence felt to the trio. Johnny dismisses his experiences.

Tommy is shown to have the ability to "see" the ghost, as well as some other entities that dwell in the land.

The next day, Vanessa and her friends Ronnie, Paolo and Nico harvest some of their plants. Along the way, Ronnie and Nico litter, urinate and spit on some mounds on the forest floor. In Filipino folklore, such areas are considered as homes of dwendes (dwarves) which will curse anyone who disrespects their homes. On the way back, Ronnie and Nico's motorcycles mysteriously stall, prompting Vanessa and Paolo to go on ahead back to the house.

Tommy finds and plays with Johnny's drugs, but the latter does not find out. He is then forced to go sober for some time.

Meanwhile, Ronnie gets his motorcycle to start up, and leaves Nico behind. As Nico walks back to the house, he notices the mango tree. He throws rocks at it to get some of its fruits. He also sees cigars near its base - cigars which were placed by Mang Dante earlier as an offering - and takes some, angering an unseen entity.

Johnny reviews his footage from earlier by the same tree showing an entity called kapre, a tall hairy tree spirit which is benevolent to those who respect it but malevolent to those who are not.

Anna is revealed to be eight weeks pregnant, but not considering marrying her boyfriend. Johnny expresses his support for his sister.

That night, Nico fails to return. Tommy keeps saying that he's dead, but no one takes heed. Johnny suggests they find him, but Paolo advises against roaming the farm at that time. Ronnie suddenly becomes very sick.

Come morning, Paolo hires a local albularyo or medicine woman to cure Ronnie who apparently fell victim to the curse of a black dwarf. After she succeeds, Vanessa then hires her to exorcise the ghost haunting the house. Paolo goes home. Although the albularyo advises against this, Vanessa insists the exorcism to be performed due to her being a current owner of the property, unlike the ghost who is now just a former owner.

Johnny finds Tommy talking to someone at a shrine outside the house. He briefly catches a glimpse of lola (whose ghost he now believes he really has been seeing due to him being sober at the moment but still seeing the ghost) and gets Anna to the spot, who confirms she is able to feel a presence and smell lola's perfume but doesn't see her. Tommy then states that lola told him to go to the mango tree and runs off. Johnny follows, leaving Anna at the shrine. Shortly afterwards, Anna is attacked by the human form of the manananggal while Tommy and Johnny find Nico's body by the tree.

That night, Ronnie and Vanessa decide to have Tommy locked up at the barn as they believe it was him and not a kapre that killed Nico. This, despite the Johnny's footage showing the kapre.

Mang Dante asks Johnny to come with him to the mango tree immediately. As Mang Dante places offerings, Johnny again sees the kapre through his videocam's night vision. Mang Dante comes back and says the kapre wants to talk to lola's descendant. Johnny is reluctant because he's afraid and doesn't speak Tagalog. Mang Dante responds that entities don't use words to communicate. Johnny offers cigars, and the kapre shows him a vision of a manananggal's lair in the forest - a creature that his lola intended to get rid of in her younger days but was unable to.

At the barn, Celia tries to unlock the doors to let Tommy out. His noise attracts the manananggal, forcing Celia to retreat. It terrorizes Tommy for some time.

Back at the house, Anna wakes up at her room and hears Tommy's cries. She asks Ronnie and Vanessa to help her get him but they refuse and reveal that the manananggal is outside. She goes out, only to find the creature at the treetops nearby. The three of them shut all the windows and doors, while the manananggal flies around.

Johnny is able to find the manananggal's lair and throws salt all over its lower body half hidden there. This will prevent the creature from merging its flying part to its lower body. Realizing that the flying part isn't nearby, he quickly goes back to Mang Dante who's at the mango tree and they hurry back to the house.

Celia is able to free Tommy from the barn. They run back to the house to help Anna.

Vanessa tells Ronnie that the manananggal is after Anna only, and that they can escape. Ronnie reluctantly goes, but not before handing Anna a machete. They leave Anna behind.

The manananggal finally enters the house and gets the unborn child out of Anna using its tongue. Unable to fly indoors, it slowly crawls to finish off Anna. Celia and Tommy arrive and splash salt all over the creature, hurting it and momentarily paralyzing it. Johnny arrives, then throws a net to prevent it from flying. Mang Dante sets it on fire, which later burns down the whole house. The five of them escape before it collapses.

As Ronnie drives away on his motorcycle, Vanessa spots a white lady by the side of the desolate road. They pass her by a few times, after which Ronnie begins seeing it too. The white lady, revealed to be lola's spirit which was forced out earlier, suddenly appears in the middle of the road. They crash, causing Vanessa's death. Ronnie walks away dazed and heavily injured.

Johnny, Mang Dante, Celia and Tommy are seen working to rebuild the house. It is implied that Johnny will stay at the farm to take care of it. He and Tommy offer flowers at the shrine, which has pictures of lola and Vanessa. As they walk away, Vanessa's vengeful spirit appears behind them.

Cast
Darrel Gamotin as Johnny, a rebellious young Pinoy from Canada who is initially reluctant to go to the Philippines. He barely remembers his time in the Philippines, and neither speaks nor understands Tagalog.
Nadine Villasin as Anna, Johnny's prissy older sister who accompanies him to the Philippines. Unlike her brother, she doesn't lose sight of her heritage.
Phoemela Baranda as Vanessa, Anna and Johnny's cousin. She's a Manila junior socialite who shares Johnny's taste for drugs and trouble.
Nicco Lorenzo Garcia as Tommy, lola's adoptive autistic grandson. He's usually at the receiving end of Vanessa's ire and the butt of her friends' jokes. Johnny develops a positive bond with him.
Nonie Buencamino as Mang Dante, the family driver/helper. He appears to have the ability to "see" and "talk" to the entities in the land, similar to Tommy.
Susan Africa as Celia, Tommy's nanny. She is genuinely concerned for Tommy and goes to great lengths to ensure his well-being.
Caroline Mangosing as Lola Nena, or simply lola. She had an exceptionally close relationship with Johnny during his younger years.
Victor Neri as Ronnie, a local drug dealer and Vanessa's friend.
Cholo Barretto as Paolo, one of Vanessa's friends. He's the one with the least air among their circle.
Ketchup Eusebio as Nico, one of Vanessa's friends. He's the one with the worst attitude among their circle. He also tends to pick on Tommy.

Cameos include Tirso Cruz III and Jacklyn Jose as Johnny and Anna's parents, Alan Paule as the siblings' grandfather and Angel Aquino as their grandfather's mistress.

Music
The original theme is composed by the writer/director/editor Romeo Candido. Original soundtrack is also music by Romeo Candido. The rest of the score is by Gerard Salonga, the score is recorded with the Global Studio Orchestra in Manila, Philippines. Samples of the music are available from the official website . Gerard Salonga has worked with artists such as Lea Salonga (his sister) and Martin Nievera. He has also arranged and conducted the Philippine Philharmonic Orchestra and Manila Philharmonic Orchestra

References

External links
 Ang Pamana's Official Website - Includes one minute theatrical trailer. Webpage requires Adobe Flash.

 The Digital Sweatshop's Official Website - Romeo Candido's and Caroline Mangosing's production company.
 Romeo Candido's blog - Director's blog
 Christine Mangosing's blog - A blog by the graphic design director showing production photos.
 Carmen De Jesus' blog - Screenwriter's blog

2006 films
Philippine thriller films
Supernatural thriller films
2000s Tagalog-language films
Canadian supernatural horror films
Philippine horror films
Films set in Canada
2000s Canadian films